Amherst Hammond (4 June 1911 – 1973) was an Indian cricketer. He played two first-class matches for Bengal in 1939/40.

See also
 List of Bengal cricketers

References

External links
 

1911 births
1973 deaths
Indian cricketers
Bengal cricketers
People from Agra